Romano Carancini (born 5 January 1961 in Macerata) is an Italian politician. A member of the Democratic Party, he was elected Mayor of Macerata on 13 April 2010 and re-confirmed for a second term on 15 June 2015.

See also
2010 Italian local elections
2015 Italian local elections
List of mayors of Macerata

References

External links
 
 

1961 births
Living people
Mayors of Macerata
People from Macerata
Democratic Party (Italy) politicians
20th-century Italian people